Md. Moniruzzaman Moni is a Bangladeshi politician and mayor of the Khulna City Corporation.

Career 
On 15 July 2008, Moni lost the Khulna mayoral election to Talukder Abdul Khaleque.

Moni was elected to Mayor of Khulna in June 2013 as a candidate of Bangladesh Nationalist Party. He beat Awami League candidate and incumbent mayor  Talukdar Abdul Khaleque.

On 2 November 2015, Moni was suspended from the post of Mayor of Khulna by the Ministry of Local Government, Rural Development and Co-operatives. This decision was taken after two criminal cases were filed against Moni. Around the same time the government also suspended Ariful Haque Choudhury, Mayor of Sylhet, Mosaddek Hossain Bulbul, Mayor of Rajshahi, and M. A. Mannan, Mayor of Gazipur. The suspension was based on criminal cases from 2014. On 22 November 2015, Bangladesh High Court upheld his suspension order.

References 

Living people
Bangladesh Nationalist Party politicians
People from Khulna District
Year of birth missing (living people)
Mayors of Khulna